Sylvia Iannuzzi-San Martín (born 8 June 1947) is an Argentine fencer. She competed in the women's individual foil events at the 1968 and 1972 Summer Olympics.

References

1947 births
Living people
Argentine female foil fencers
Olympic fencers of Argentina
Fencers at the 1968 Summer Olympics
Fencers at the 1972 Summer Olympics
People from San Fernando de la Buena Vista
Sportspeople from Buenos Aires Province